Eggplant (US, Canada), aubergine (UK, Ireland) or brinjal (Indian subcontinent, Singapore, Malaysia, South Africa) is a plant species in the nightshade family Solanaceae. Solanum melongena is grown worldwide for its edible fruit.

Most commonly purple, the spongy, absorbent fruit is used in several cuisines. Typically used as a vegetable in cooking, it is a berry by botanical definition. As a member of the genus Solanum, it is related to the tomato, chili pepper, and potato, although those are of the New World while the eggplant is of the Old World. Like the tomato, its skin and seeds can be eaten, but, like the potato, it is usually eaten cooked. Eggplant is nutritionally low in macronutrient and micronutrient content, but the capability of the fruit to absorb oils and flavors into its flesh through cooking expands its use in the culinary arts.

It was originally domesticated from the wild nightshade species thorn or bitter apple, S. incanum, probably with two independent domestications: one in South Asia, and one in East Asia. In 2018, China and India combined accounted for 87% of the world production of eggplants.

Description

The eggplant is a delicate, tropical perennial plant often cultivated as a tender or half-hardy annual in temperate climates. The stem is often spiny. The flowers are white to purple in color, with a five-lobed corolla and yellow stamens. Some common cultivars have fruit that is egg-shaped, glossy, and purple with white flesh and a spongy, "meaty" texture. Some other cultivars are white and longer in shape. The cut surface of the flesh rapidly turns brown when the fruit is cut open (oxidation).

Botanically classified as a berry, the fruit contains numerous small, soft, edible seeds that taste bitter because they contain or are covered in nicotinoid alkaloids, like the related tobacco.

History 

There is no consensus about the place of origin of eggplant; the plant species has been described as native to India, where it continues to grow wild, Africa, or South Asia. It has been cultivated in southern and eastern Asia since prehistory. The first known written record of the plant is found in Qimin Yaoshu, an ancient Chinese agricultural treatise completed in 544 CE. The numerous Arabic and North African names for it, along with the lack of the ancient Greek and Roman names, indicate it was grown throughout the Mediterranean area by the Arabs in the early Middle Ages, who introduced it to Spain in the 8th century. A book on agriculture by Ibn Al-Awwam in 12th-century Arabic Spain described how to grow aubergines. Records exist from later medieval Catalan and Spanish.

The aubergine is unrecorded in England until the 16th century. An English botany book in 1597 described the madde or raging Apple:

Because of the plant's relationship with various other nightshades, the fruit was at one time believed to be extremely poisonous. The flowers and leaves can be poisonous if consumed in large quantities due to the presence of solanine.

The eggplant has a special place in folklore. In 13th-century Italian traditional folklore, the eggplant can cause insanity.  In 19th-century Egypt, insanity was said to be "more common and more violent" when the eggplant is in season in the summer.

Etymology and regional names

The plant and fruit have a profusion of English names.

Eggplant-type names

The name eggplant is usual in North American English and Australian English. First recorded in 1763, the word "eggplant" was originally applied to white cultivars, which look very much like hen's eggs (see image). Similar names are widespread in other languages, such as the Icelandic term eggaldin or the Welsh planhigyn ŵy.

The white, egg-shaped varieties of the eggplant's fruits are also known as garden eggs, a term first attested in 1811. The Oxford English Dictionary records that between 1797 and 1888, the name vegetable egg was also used.

Aubergine-type names
Whereas eggplant was coined in English, most of the diverse other European names for the plant derive from the Arabic word bāḏinjān. Bāḏinjān is itself a loan-word in Arabic, whose earliest traceable origins lie in the Dravidian languages. The Hobson-Jobson dictionary comments that 'probably there is no word of the kind which has undergone such extraordinary variety of modifications, whilst retaining the same meaning, as this'.

In English usage, modern names deriving from Arabic bāḏinjān include:

Aubergine, usual in British English (as well as German, French and Dutch).
Brinjal or brinjaul, usual in South Asia and South African English.
Solanum melongena, the Linnaean name.

From Dravidian to Arabic

All the aubergine-type names have the same origin, in the Dravidian languages. Modern descendants of this ancient Dravidian word include Malayalam vaṟutina and Tamil vaṟutuṇai.

The Dravidian word was borrowed into the Indo-Aryan languages, giving ancient forms such as Sanskrit and Pali vātiṅ-gaṇa (alongside Sanskrit vātigama) and Prakrit vāiṃaṇa. According to the entry brinjal in the Oxford English Dictionary, the Sanskrit word vātin-gāna denoted 'the class (that removes) the wind-disorder (windy humour)': that is, vātin-gāna came to be the name for eggplants because they were thought to cure flatulence. The modern Hindustani words descending directly from the Sanskrit name are baingan and began.

The Indic word vātiṅ-gaṇa was then borrowed into Persian as bādingān. Persian bādingān was borrowed in turn into Arabic as bāḏinjān (or, with the definite article, al-bāḏinjān). From Arabic, the word was borrowed into European languages.

From Arabic into Iberia and beyond
In al-Andalus, the Arabic word (al-)bāḏinjān was borrowed into the Romance languages in forms beginning with b- or, with the definite article included, alb-:
 Spanish , .

The French name was then borrowed into British English, appearing there first in the late eighteenth century.

Through the colonial expansion of Portugal, the Portuguese form  was borrowed into a variety of other languages:
 Indian, Malaysian, Singaporean and South African English brinjal, brinjaul (first attested in the seventeenth century).
 West Indian English brinjalle and (through folk-etymology) brown-jolly.

Thus although Indian English brinjal ultimately originates in languages of the Indian Subcontinent, it actually came into Indian English via Portuguese.

From Arabic into Greek and beyond

The Arabic word bāḏinjān was borrowed into Greek by the eleventh century CE. The Greek loans took a variety of forms, but crucially they began with m-, partly because Greek lacked the initial b- sound and partly through folk-etymological association with the Greek word μέλας (melas), 'black'. Attested Greek forms include ματιζάνιον (matizanion, eleventh-century), μελιντζάνα (melintzana, fourteenth-century), and μελιντζάνιον (melintzanion, seventeenth-century).

From Greek, the word was borrowed into Italian and medieval Latin, and onwards into French. Early forms include:
 Melanzāna, recorded in Sicilian in the twelfth century.
 Melongena, recorded in Latin in the thirteenth century.
 Melongiana, recorded in Veronese in the fourteenth century.
 Melanjan, recorded in Old French.

From these forms came the botanical Latin melongēna. This was used by Tournefort as a genus name in 1700, then by Linnaeus as a species name in 1753. It remains in scientific use.

These forms also gave rise to the Caribbean English melongene.

The Italian melanzana, through folk-etymology, was adapted to mela insana ('mad apple'): already by the thirteenth century, this name had given rise to a tradition that eggplants could cause insanity. Translated into English as 'mad-apple', 'rage-apple', or 'raging apple', this name for eggplants is attested from 1578 and the form 'mad-apple' may still be found in Southern American English.

Other English names

The plant is also known as guinea squash in Southern American English. The term guinea in the name originally denoted the fact that the fruits were associated with West Africa.

It has been known as 'Jew's apple', apparently in relation to a belief that the fruit was first imported to the West Indies by Jewish people.

Cultivars

Different cultivars of the plant produce fruit of different size, shape, and color, though typically purple. The less common white varieties of eggplant are also known as Easter white eggplants, garden eggs, Casper or white eggplant.

A much wider range of shapes, sizes, and colors is grown in India and elsewhere in Asia. Larger cultivars weighing up to a kilogram (2.2 pounds) grow in the region between the Ganges and Yamuna Rivers, while smaller ones are found elsewhere. Colors vary from white to yellow or green, as well as reddish-purple and dark purple. Some cultivars have a color gradient—white at the stem, to bright pink, deep purple or even black. Green or purple cultivars with white striping also exist. Chinese cultivars are commonly shaped like a narrower, slightly pendulous cucumber. Also, Asian cultivars of Japanese breeding are grown.
 Oval or elongated oval-shaped and black-skinned cultivars include 'Harris Special Hibush', 'Burpee Hybrid', 'Bringal Bloom', 'Black Magic', 'Classic', 'Dusky', and 'Black Beauty'.
 Slim cultivars in purple-black skin include 'Little Fingers', 'Ichiban', 'Pingtung Long', and 'Tycoon'
 In green skin, 'Louisiana Long Green' and 'Thai (Long) Green'
 In white skin, 'Dourga'.
 Traditional, white-skinned, egg-shaped cultivars include 'Casper' and 'Easter Egg'.
 Bicolored cultivars with color gradient include 'Rosa Bianca', 'Violetta di Firenze', 'Bianca Sfumata di Rosa' (heirloom), and 'Prosperosa' (heirloom).
 Bicolored cultivars with striping include 'Listada de Gandia' and 'Udumalapet'.
 In some parts of India, miniature cultivars, most commonly called baigan, are popular.

Varieties 

 S. m. var. esculentum – common aubergine, including white varieties, with many cultivars
 S. m. var. depressum – dwarf aubergine
 S. m. var. serpentium – snake aubergine

Genetically engineered eggplant
Bt brinjal is a transgenic eggplant that contains a gene from the soil bacterium Bacillus thuringiensis. This variety was designed to give the plant resistance to lepidopteran insects such as the brinjal fruit and shoot borer (Leucinodes orbonalis) and fruit borer (Helicoverpa armigera).

On 9 February 2010, the Environment Ministry of India imposed a moratorium on the cultivation of Bt brinjal after protests against regulatory approval of cultivated Bt brinjal in 2009, stating the moratorium would last "for as long as it is needed to establish public trust and confidence".  This decision was deemed controversial, as it deviated from previous practices with other genetically modified crops in India. Bt brinjal was approved for commercial cultivation in Bangladesh in 2013.

Cooking and preparing

Raw eggplant can have a bitter taste, with an astringent quality, but it becomes tender when cooked and develops a rich, complex flavor. Rinsing, draining, and salting the sliced fruit before cooking may remove the bitterness. The fruit is capable of absorbing cooking fats and sauces, which may enhance the flavor of eggplant dishes.

Eggplant is used in the cuisines of many countries. Due to its texture and bulk, it is sometimes used as a meat substitute in vegan and vegetarian cuisines.  Eggplant flesh is smooth. Its numerous seeds are small, soft and edible, along with the rest of the fruit, and do not have to be removed. Its thin skin is also edible, and so it does not have to be peeled. However, the green part at the top, the calyx, does have to be removed when preparing an eggplant for cooking.

Eggplant can be steamed, stir-fried, pan fried, deep fried, barbecued, roasted, stewed, curried, or pickled. Many eggplant dishes are sauces made by mashing the cooked fruit. It can be stuffed. It is frequently, but not always, cooked with oil or fat.

East Asia 
Korean and Japanese eggplant varieties are typically thin-skinned.

In Chinese cuisine, eggplants are known as qiézi. They are often deep fried and made into dishes such as yúxiāng-qiézi ("fish fragrance eggplant") or di sān xiān ("three earthen treasures"). Elsewhere in China, such as in Yunnan cuisine (in particular the cuisine of the Dai people) they are barbecued or roasted, then split and either eaten directly with garlic, chilli, oil and coriander, or the flesh is removed and pounded to a mash (typically with a wooden pestle and mortar) before being eaten with rice or other dishes.

In Japanese cuisine, eggplants are known as nasu or nasubi and use the same characters as Chinese. An example of it use is in the dish hasamiyaki in which slices of eggplant are grilled and filled with a meat stuffing.

In Korean cuisine, eggplants are known as gaji. They are steamed, stir-fried, or pan-fried and eaten as banchan (side dishes), such as namul, bokkeum, and jeon.

Southeast Asia
In the Philippines, eggplants are of the long and slender purple variety. They are known as talong and is widely used in many stew and soup dishes, like pinakbet. However the most popular eggplant dish is tortang talong, an omelette made from grilling an eggplant, dipping it into beaten eggs, and pan-frying the mixture. The dish is characteristically served with the stalk attached. The dish has several variants, including rellenong talong which is stuffed with meat and vegetables. Eggplant can also be grilled, skinned and eaten as a salad called ensaladang talong. Another popular dish is adobong talong, which is diced eggplant prepared with vinegar, soy sauce, and garlic as an adobo.

South Asia 
Eggplant is widely used in its native India, for example in sambar (a tamarind lentil stew), dalma (a dal preparation with vegetables, native to Odisha), chutney, curry, and achaar (a pickled dish). Owing to its versatile nature and wide use in both everyday and festive Indian food, it is often described as the "king of vegetables". Roasted, skinned, mashed, mixed with onions, tomatoes, and spices, and then slow cooked gives the South Asian dish baingan bharta or gojju, similar to salată de vinete in Romania. Another version of the dish, begun-pora (eggplant charred or burnt), is very popular in Bangladesh and the east Indian states of Odisha and West Bengal where the pulp of the vegetable is mixed with raw chopped shallot, green chilies, salt, fresh coriander, and mustard oil. Sometimes fried tomatoes and deep-fried potatoes are also added, creating a dish called begun bhorta. In a dish from Maharashtra called , small brinjals are stuffed with ground coconut, peanuts, onions, tamarind, jaggery and masala spices, and then cooked in oil.  Maharashtra and the adjacent state of Karnataka also have an eggplant-based vegetarian pilaf called 'vangi bhat' ..

Middle East and the Mediterranean 

Eggplant is often stewed, as in the French ratatouille, or deep-fried as in the Italian parmigiana di melanzane, the Turkish karnıyarık, or Turkish, Greek, and Levantine musakka/moussaka, and Middle Eastern and South Asian dishes. Eggplants can also be battered before deep-frying and served with a sauce made of tahini and tamarind. In Iranian cuisine, it is blended with whey as kashk e bademjan, tomatoes as mirza ghassemi, or made into stew as khoresht-e-bademjan. It can be sliced and deep-fried, then served with plain yogurt (optionally topped with a tomato and garlic sauce), such as in the Turkish dish patlıcan kızartması (meaning fried aubergines), or without yogurt, as in patlıcan şakşuka. Perhaps the best-known Turkish eggplant dishes are imam bayıldı (vegetarian) and karnıyarık (with minced meat). It may also be roasted in its skin until charred, so the pulp can be removed and blended with other ingredients, such as lemon, tahini, and garlic, as in the Arab baba ghanoush and the similar Greek melitzanosalata. A mix of roasted eggplant, roasted red peppers, chopped onions, tomatoes, mushrooms, carrots, celery, and spices is called zacuscă in Romania, and ajvar or pinjur in the Balkans.

A Spanish dish called escalivada in Catalonia calls for strips of roasted aubergine, sweet pepper, onion, and tomato. In Andalusia, eggplant is mostly cooked thinly sliced, deep-fried in olive oil and served hot with honey (berenjenas a la Cordobesa). In the La Mancha region of central Spain, a small eggplant is pickled in vinegar, paprika, olive oil, and red peppers. The result is berenjena of Almagro, Ciudad Real. A Levantine specialty is makdous, another pickling of eggplants, stuffed with red peppers and walnuts in olive oil. Eggplant can be hollowed out and stuffed with meat, rice, or other fillings, and then baked. In Georgia, for example, it is fried and stuffed with walnut paste to make nigvziani badrijani.

The eggplant was brought to Europe through the Iberian Peninsula where it was consumed by Muslims and Sephardic Jews, and was relatively unknown in other parts of Europe (except southern Italy) perhaps as late as the 17th century. It is considered to this day one of the defining ingredients of Sephardic Jewish cuisine.

Iran 
In Iranian cuisine, eggplant (called bādenjān or bādemjān in Persian) can be used in both appetizers and main courses. It can also be pickled in vinegar. The ideal eggplant in Iranian cuisine is long, straight, firm, and black. Based on how al-Razi uses the color of eggplant as a shorthand for purpleness in his Kitab al-hawi, it can be assumed that the dark purple kind of eggplant was the widely grown variety in Iran at his time (9th century). Its importance in Iran is alluded to in the Ain-i-Akbari of Abu'l-Fazl ibn Mubarak, which says "this vegetable is on sale in the markets in Iran all the year round and in such abundance that it is sold for 1.5 dams per seer" (which was a cheap price at that time).

In Iran, unlike places like Greece, Turkey, and North Africa, eggplant is cooked peeled and usually seasoned with cinnamon or especially turmeric. Most eggplant dishes are classified as nankhoreshi (eaten with bread), and they are commonly served as snacks alongside alcoholic beverages.

The 14th-century poet Boshaq At'ema refers to an early eggplant dish called burani-e badenjan: chopped eggplant sautéed with onions and turmeric, then slowly cooked, and finally mixed with yogurt. The combination of eggplant and kashk (condensed whey) is popular in Iranian cuisine; it is found in dishes like kashk o badenjan as well as ash-e kashk o badenjan (involving layers of sautéed eggplant, grilled onions, and red beans topped by kashk seasoned with turmeric). Another eggplant dish is mast o badenjan, also known as nazkhatun in Tehran, which involves eggplant, yogurt, and dried mint. Eggplant can also be cooked in stews (khoreshes), either with lamb (khoresh-e badenjan) or with chicken and either unripe grapes or pomegranate juice (mosamma-ye badenjan). Variants of ab-gusht, eshkana, fesenjan, and kuku also make use of eggplant. Some regional dishes involving eggplant include badenjan-polow, a dish mainly from Fars and Kerman that combines white rice with a paste of chopped sautéed eggplant, chopped meat, and spices; as well as the northern Iranian badenjan-e qasemi, a casserole using grilled eggplant, garlic, tomatoes, and eggs.

Eggplants are traditionally among the foods that get preserved and stored for winter in Iran. They are selected in the last month of summer, when they are most readily available, then peeled, and finally preserved in one of two ways. In the first way, the peeled eggplants are cut, salted, and left to "sweat" (to make them less bilious); then they are sun-dried by hanging them on a line. The dried eggplants are then rehydrated 24 hours before being cooked. In the second way, the peeled eggplants are cooked in oil, put in a copper pot, and finally covered with plenty of hot oil, "which congeals to seal them".

Medieval Iranian writers such as al-Razi and al-Biruni cautioned that eggplant contains harmful qualities, and it must be ripe and cooked before eating to neutralize them. They wrote that it could cause heat and dryness and an excess of black bile, contributing to a wide range of health problems. If the "salt" in it was removed, or it was cooked in oil or vinegar, then they wrote that eggplant gained healthy atttributes. Present-day Iranian attitudes to the eggplant reflect this medical tradition's influence: the eggplant is "considered rather dangerous... a cook in Tehran will say that the  poison must be taken out". People also use eggplant seeds as an expectorant to relieve asthma and catarrh.

Nutrition

Raw eggplant is 92% water, 6% carbohydrates, 1% protein, and has negligible fat (table). It provides low amounts of essential nutrients, with only manganese having a moderate percentage (11%) of the Daily Value. Minor changes in nutrient composition occur with season, environment of cultivation (open field or greenhouse), and genotype.

Cultivation and pests
In tropical and subtropical climates, eggplant can be sown in the garden. Eggplant grown in temperate climates fares better when transplanted into the garden after all danger of frost has passed. Eggplant prefers hot weather, and when grown in cold climates or in areas with low humidity, the plants languish or fail to set and produce mature fruit.  Seeds are typically started eight to 10 weeks prior to the anticipated frost-free date. S. melongena is included on a list of low flammability plants, indicating that it is suitable for growing within a building protection zone.

Mulching helps conserve moisture and prevent weeds and fungal diseases and the plants benefit from some shade during the hottest part of the day. Hand pollination by shaking the flowers improves the set of the first blossoms. Growers typically cut fruits from the vine just above the calyx owing to the somewhat woody stems. Flowers are complete, containing both female and male structures, and may be self- or cross-pollinated.

Many of the pests and diseases that afflict other solanaceous plants, such as tomato, capsicum, and potato, are also troublesome to eggplants. For this reason, it should generally not be planted in areas previously occupied by its close relatives. However, since eggplants can be particularly susceptible to pests such as whiteflies, they are sometimes grown with slightly less susceptible plants, such as chili pepper, as a sacrificial trap crop. Four years should separate successive crops of eggplants to reduce pest pressure.

Common North American pests include the potato beetles, flea beetles, aphids, whiteflies, and spider mites. Good sanitation and crop rotation practices are extremely important for controlling fungal disease, the most serious of which is Verticillium.

The potato tuber moth (Phthorimaea operculella) is an oligophagous insect that prefers to feed on plants of the family Solanaceae such as eggplants. Female P. operculella use the leaves to lay their eggs and the hatched larvae will eat away at the mesophyll of the leaf.

Production

In 2020, world production of eggplants was 57 million tonnes, led by China with 65% of the total and India with 23% (table).

Chemistry 
The color of purple skin cultivars is due to the anthocyanin nasunin.

The browning of eggplant flesh results from the oxidation of polyphenols, such as the most abundant phenolic compound in the fruit, chlorogenic acid.

Allergies

Case reports of itchy skin or mouth, mild headache, and stomach upset after handling or eating eggplant have been reported anecdotally and published in medical journals (see also oral allergy syndrome).

A 2008 study of a sample of 741 people in India, where eggplant is commonly consumed, found nearly 10% reported some allergic symptoms after consuming eggplant, with 1.4% showing symptoms within two hours.
Contact dermatitis from eggplant leaves and allergy to eggplant flower pollen have also been reported.

Individuals who are atopic (genetically predisposed to developing certain allergic hypersensitivity reactions) are more likely to have a reaction to eggplant, which may be because eggplant is high in histamines. A few proteins and at least one secondary metabolite have been identified as potential allergens. Cooking eggplant thoroughly seems to preclude reactions in some individuals, but at least one of the allergenic proteins survives the cooking process.

Taxonomy

The eggplant is quite often featured in the older scientific literature under the junior synonyms S. ovigerum and S. trongum. Several other names that are now invalid have been uniquely applied to it:

 Melongena ovata 
 Solanum album 
 Solanum insanum 
 Solanum longum 
 Solanum melanocarpum 
 Solanum melongenum 
 Solanum oviferum 
 Prachi 

A number of subspecies and varieties have been named, mainly by Dikii, Dunal, and (invalidly) by Sweet. However, Solanum incanum and cockroach berry (S. capsicoides), other eggplant-like nightshades described by Linnaeus and Allioni, respectively, were occasionally considered eggplant varieties, but this is not correct.

The eggplant has a long history of taxonomic confusion with the scarlet and Ethiopian eggplants (Solanum aethiopicum), known as gilo and nakati, respectively, and described by Linnaeus as S. aethiopicum. The eggplant was sometimes considered a variety violaceum of that species. S. violaceum of de Candolle applies to Linnaeus' S. aethiopicum. An actual S. violaceum, an unrelated plant described by Ortega, included Dunal's S. amblymerum and was often confused with the same author's S. brownii.

Like the potato and S. lichtensteinii, but unlike the tomato, which then was generally put in a different genus, the eggplant was also described as S. esculentum, in this case once more in the course of Dunal's work. He also recognized the varieties aculeatum, inerme, and subinerme at that time. Similarly, H.C.F. Schuhmacher and Peter Thonning named the eggplant as S. edule, which is also a junior synonym of sticky nightshade (S. sisymbriifolium). Scopoli's S. zeylanicum refers to the eggplant, and that of Blanco to S. lasiocarpum.

See also

 List of eggplant cultivars
 Eggplant emoji
 Eggplant production in China
 Eggplant salads and appetizers
 Imperial examination in Chinese mythology
 Lao eggplant
 List of eggplant dishes
 Solanum aethiopicum
 Vietnamese eggplant

References

 
Crops originating from India
Crops originating from Pakistan
Solanum
Flora of the Maldives
Fruits originating in Asia
Plants described in 1753
Tropical fruit
Fruit vegetables